Belladonna of Sadness is the debut studio album by American singer Alexandra Savior, released on April 7, 2017 by Columbia Records.

Background and recording
The recording process for Belladonna of Sadness was captured by film director Ben Chappell in the video "Alexandra Savior – An Introduction", which featured on Savior's YouTube channel. In June 2016, Savior stated in an interview that the studio setup for the album mostly consisted of collaborators Alex Turner and James Ford, with the three occasionally augmented by bassist Zachary Dawes.

Critical reception

Belladonna of Sadness was released to mostly positive reviews. Paste praised Savior's singing, comparing her style to Françoise Hardy and Lana Del Rey. There were mixed reviews from The Guardian, writing that the album made Savior sound more "like an imitation, than the real thing." and from Pitchfork, writing "Instead of a debut album that flaunts the dynamism of a new artist, the result is an album that barely even feels like one—or, at the very least, only vaguely resembles a collaborative effort that casts Savior as the hostess of Turner’s discount ideas."

Accolades

Track listing

Personnel
Credits are adapted from the Belladonna of Sadness liner notes.

Musicians
 Alexandra Savior – vocals
 James Ford – drums, percussion, keyboards, synthesisers, vibraphone , guitars , bass 
 Alex Turner – bass , guitars, keyboards, synthesisers
 Zach Dawes – bass , vibraphone , organ 

Production
 James Ford – production, mixing
 Alex Turner – production
 Michael Harris – engineering
 Bob Ludwig – mastering

Artwork
 Alexandra Savior – photography, art direction and design
 Samuel Kristofski – photography
 Maria Paula Marulanda – art direction and design

Charts

References

External links

Alexandra Savior albums
2017 debut albums
Columbia Records albums
Albums recorded at Electro-Vox Recording Studios